An sluagh sidhe so i nEamhuin? (also known as Is this a fairy host in Navan Fort?) is an Irish poem dated to the late 16th century.

An sluagh sidhe so i nEamhuin? is

See also

 Cóir Connacht ar chath Laighean

External links
 Full text

References

Medieval poetry
Irish literature
Irish poems
Irish texts
Early Irish literature
Irish-language literature
O'Neill dynasty